"Sandy" is a song written by Terry Fell and performed by Larry Hall.  It reached #15 on the U.S. pop chart in 1960.  It was featured on his 1960 album "Sandy" and Other Larry Hall Hits!

The song ranked #100 on Billboard magazine's Top 100 singles of 1960.

Other charting versions
Johnny Crawford released a version of the song as a single in 1964 which reached #108 on the U.S. pop chart.

Other versions
Under the name Johnny Valentine, Fell released a version of the song as the B-side to his 1958 single "Angel on a Cloud".
Craig Douglas released a version of the song as the B-side to his 1960 single "Pretty Blue Eyes".

References

1958 songs
1959 debut singles
1964 singles
Songs written by Terry Fell